Laughing Squid is a blog featuring items of art, culture, and technology, as well as a web hosting company based out of New York City, New York.

History

Laughing Squid was founded on November 16, 1995 in San Francisco, California as a film and video production company by Scott Beale, producing documentaries, including Alonso G. Smith, A Half Century of Social Surrealism about San Francisco Bay Area surrealist painter Alonso Smith and You’d Better Watch Out: Portland Santacon ’96 about the SantaCon event in Portland, OR organized by the San Francisco Cacophony Society in 1996.

In 1996, Laughing Squid launched The Squid List, a San Francisco Bay Area art and culture events calendar and email list that was decommissioned in 2013.

In 1998, Laughing Squid launched a web hosting company Laughing Squid Hosting.

In 2000, Laughing Squid became an LLC with John Law and David Klass joining as partners.

The blog launched in 2003.

Laughing Squid sponsored the back of Frank Chu's sign from 2009 to 2013.

In 2010, the company moved its headquarters to New York City, New York.

Philosophy and impact

Laughing Squid's main goal is to report, document, and inform the public about important events, projects and people in the field of art, technology and science.

Gizmodo sees Laughing Squid as one of the 25 most viral media enterprises, commenting: "Scott Beale's events tracker the SquidList gave birth to his Laughing Squid web hosting business. Which gave birth to his weblog. Which gave birth to his Tumblr and Twitter—all of which breathed life into thousands of obscure stories that otherwise would have fallen soundlessly in digital forests. Today the smiling cephalopod is basically his own media empire".

According to Quantcast, over 1.4 million people worldwide visit the site each month.

Team

The Laughing Squid blog is run by founder Scott Beale, who is Publisher and Editor-In-Chief. He is joined by Contributing Editor Lori Dorn.

Awards

 2011 Webby Award: Web (Blog - Cultural) - People's Voice

References

External links
 Laughing Squid blog
 Laughing Squid web hosting service

American news websites
Webby Award winners
Mass media in San Francisco
1995 establishments in California